Gerald Patterson defeated Randolph Lycett 6–3, 6–4, 6–2 in the final to win the gentlemen's singles tennis title at the 1922 Wimbledon Championships. Bill Tilden was the defending champion, but did not participate.

Draw

Finals

Top half

Section 1

Section 2

Section 3

Section 4

Bottom half

Section 5

Section 6

Section 7

Section 8

References

External links

Men's Singles
Wimbledon Championship by year – Men's singles